Christopher John Pilling (born 30 March 1965) is British banker who was the Chief Executive of the Yorkshire Building Society from 2012 to December 2016, at that time the second-largest building society in the UK.

Early life
He attended the Royal Grammar School, High Wycombe from 1977 to 1983. He studied geography at Jesus College, Cambridge from 1984 to 1987.

Career

P&G
He joined P&G in 1987, becoming the brand manager of Daz at Gosforth.

British Airways
He joined British Airways in 1994.

Welcome to Yorkshire
He worked for Welcome to Yorkshire from 2005 to 2008.

Yorkshire Building Society
In January 2012 he became Chief Executive of the Yorkshire Building Society, leaving in December 2016.

Personal life
He lives in Harrogate with his wife and two daughters, one of whom also goes to Jesus College, and the other one is at University College, Durham

References

External links
 Yorkshire Building Society

1966 births
Alumni of Jesus College, Cambridge
English chief executives
People educated at the Royal Grammar School, High Wycombe
People from Harrogate
People from High Wycombe
Living people